Pilsensee is a lake in Oberbayern, Bavaria, Germany. At an elevation of 534 m, its surface area is 1.95 km².

External links 
 

Lakes of Bavaria